Karl Emil Lindgren (born 4 May 1985 in Falun) is a Swedish professional mountain biker. Riding the sport for more than 15 years, Lindgren has won ten Swedish national championship titles in men's mountain biking (both under the men's junior and elite categories), and later represented his nation Sweden at the 2008 Summer Olympics. In 2009, Lindgren reached the summit of his mountain biking career by grabbing a first-place trophy and a yellow jersey at the Afxentia Stage Race, also known as the Sunshine Cup, in Cyprus. Lindgren currently trains and races professionally for the 2013 season on the Giant Pro XC Team, although he has appeared short stints on Bianchi, Full-Dynamix, De Brink-Ten Tusscher, and  cycling teams.

Lindgren qualified for the Swedish squad, along with his teammate and two-time Olympian Fredrik Kessiakoff, in the men's cross-country race at the 2008 Summer Olympics in Beijing by receiving one of the nation's two available berths from the Swedish Cycling Federation and the Union Cycliste Internationale (UCI), based on his best performance at the World Cup series, World and European Championships, and Mountain Biking World Series. Lindgren could not upgrade a much stellar ride to complete a 4.8-km sturdy, treacherous cross-country course, as he decided to end his course with only two laps left and a thirty-eighth-place finish because of bike problems.

He also competes in cyclo-cross, having won the Swedish National Cyclo-Cross Championships in 2010 and 2020.

Career achievements

2004
 1st  Swedish MTB Championships (Cross-country, ITT), Sweden
2007
 3rd Swedish MTB Championships (Cross-country & team relay), Huskvarna (SWE)
2008
 1st  Swedish MTB Championships (Team relay), Norberg (SWE)
 2nd Swedish MTB Championships (Cross-country), Norberg (SWE)
 2nd Swedish MTB Championships (Cyclo-cross), Gothenburg (SWE)
 3rd Swedish MTB Championships (Cross-country, ITT), Norberg (SWE)
 3rd Stage 1, Afxentia Stage Race, Cyprus
  European Championships (Team relay), Sankt Wendel (GER)
 38th Olympic Games (Cross-country), Beijing (CHN)
2009
 1st  Overall, Afxentia Stage Race, Cyprus
 1st Stages 1, 2, & 3
 3rd Swedish MTB Championships (Cyclo-cross), Borås (SWE)
2010
 1st  Swedish MTB Championships (Cyclo-cross), Sweden
 19th UCI World Championships (Cross-country), Mont Sainte-Anne (CAN)
2011
 1st  Swedish MTB Championships (Cross-country, ITT, & Team relay), Borås (SWE)
 18th UCI World Championships (Cross-country), Champéry (SUI)
2012
 1st  Points classification, Afxentia Stage Race, Cyprus
 2nd Overall, Afxentia Stage Race, Cyprus
2013
 2nd Langkawi International MTB Challenge, Langkawi (MAS)
2019
 1st, Cykelvasan, Sweden

References

External links
 

NBC Olympics Profile 

1985 births
Living people
Swedish male cyclists
Cross-country mountain bikers
Cyclists at the 2008 Summer Olympics
Olympic cyclists of Sweden
People from Falun
Cyclists at the 2015 European Games
European Games competitors for Sweden
Cape Epic cyclists
Sportspeople from Dalarna County